Swiss Italians of Australia are Italian-speaking Swiss that settled in Australia during the 1850s and 1860s. The Swiss Italians initially settled in the area around Daylesford, Victoria. The Swiss settlers were from the canton of Ticino and the southern part of Graubünden.

The influence of Swiss Italians in Australia, Italian-speaking Swiss from the cantons of Ticino and Grison and northern Italians, is still present in the township of Hepburn Springs through the names of its residents, the names of its springs (Locarno) and buildings (Savoia Hotel, Parma House, Perinis, Bellinzona), and the annual Swiss-Italian Festa.

The heart of the Italian-speaking community was the area around the Savoia (Spring Creek) Hotel and the Macaroni Factory. The Savoia is named after the royal family of unified Italy. An Italian reading library was located at the hotel and pasta was made opposite in Lucini's Macaroni Factory which was also home to the Democratic Club. Lucini's moved from Lonsdale Street, Melbourne in 1865, where they had set up as the first pasta factory in Australia in 1864. Vanzetta's bakery supplied bread to the community and Crippa, Perini, and the Gervasoni's (Yandoit Creek) produced wine.

In 2007, the Melbourne Immigration Museum featured a display entitled Wine Water and Stone reflecting the Swiss and Italian heritage of the area.

Swiss Italian food and culture
The Swiss Italians loved sport, food, and music. Their influence on local culture is celebrated annually during the Swiss Italian Festa.  Swiss Italians of Australia have made their mark in spheres of art, music, literature, journalism, sport, education, science, and engineering.

A local delicacy is bullboar, which is a sausage made from beef, pork, garlic, and spices. Local families jealously guard their recipes. In 2005 Daylesford Secondary College came in second place in the Australian Broadcasting Corporation's Young Gourmets by making bullboars from the Gervasoni and Sartori recipes, which gained much media attention over the fate of Charlotte the pig, with little concern for the steer involved. The bullboar has been named an endangered recipe by the Slow Food Movement.

Swiss Italian heritage places
Elvizia Homestead Yandoit
Hepburn Mineral Springs Reserve
Former Macaroni Factory Hepburn Springs
Parma House Hepburn Springs
Swimming Pool Hepburn Springs
Former Carlo Gervasoni Homestead Yandoit Creek

Swiss Italian places of significance
Lavandula Swiss Italian Farm Lavender Farm | French Lavender – Lavandula Farm Daylesford located in Shepherds Flat, Victoria (about 10 km north of Daylesford) was originally a dairy farm set up by Aquilino Tinetti (born 1835 d. 1905) in the 1860s. He eventually married Maria Virgilia Martina Capriroli (born 1850 d. 1932) and had 13 children. The dairy farm ran from 1860 until about 1975. The property and its historic buildings was eventually purchased by Carol White in the late 80s. The buildings were restored and the property was given a new lease of life as a lavender farm and European-style gardens. Besides being a working farm, the property now boasts a number of attractions including guided tours of the original stone farmhouse and a history room.

Swiss Italian Festa
The Swiss Italian Festa was first held in 1993. The Festa is an annual event to celebrate the history, culture and lifestyle legacy to Hepburn Springs of its Swiss and Italian settlers. The theme of the Festa is supported by the community to acknowledge our history, celebrate our lifestyle and to nurture our cultural heritage for tomorrow.

Notable Swiss Italians of Australia
 Ron Barassi – Melbourne premiership player in 1955, 1956, 1957, 1959, 1960, 1964; Melbourne Captain 1960–64; All Australian 1956, 1958, 1961; Carlton premiership coach 1968, 1970 North Melbourne premiership coach 1975, 1977; Australian Football Hall of Fame; Sport Australia Hall of Fame (2006); VFL/AFL Italian Team of the Century (coach) 2007; 2009 Victorian of the Year
 Vern Barberis – Olympic Bronze Medalist and Commonwealth Games Gold Medalist in weightlifting
 Mark Beretta – Ten-time champion water-skier and sportscaster
 Nellie Louise Carbasse, better known by her stage name "Louise Lovely", the first Australian actress to find success in Hollywood
 Carlo Catani – Civil engineer for Victoria's Public Works Department who oversaw the following projects: draining the Koo-Wee-Rup Swamp, widening and improving the Yarra River upstream from Princes Bridge, laying out and planting the Alexandra Gardens, roads to Arthurs Seat and Mount Donna Buang, Murray River levees in Strathmerton, Lake Catani in Mount Buffalo National Park, reclamation of the foreshore of St Kilda. There is a bronze bust of Catani at the foot of Schefferle's memorial clock tower on the St. Kilda Esplanade.
 Robert de Castella – Long-distance runner, 1983 World Marathon Champion, 1982 and 1986 Commonwealth Games Marathon Champion
 Jack Gervasoni – Australian Rules Footballer (Fitzroy) Captain Coach (Northcote); educator; Mayor of Kew 
 Len Incigneri – Australian Rules Footballer (South Melbourne) and Captain Coach (Richmond)
 Steve Moneghetti- Olympian and Commonwealth Games Gold Medallist 
 Tony Polinelli – Australian Rules Footballer, Premiership player (Geelong) and runner up in the Stawell Gift

Samuel Victor Alberto Zelman – Musician and conductor, and founder of the Melbourne Symphony Orchestra
Victor Zelman – Artist

References

 
European Australian
 
Swiss diaspora